Bisi Komolafe  (1986–2012) was a Nigerian actress, film director and producer best known for her role in the movies Igboro Ti Daru and Aramotu.

Early life and education
Bisi Komolafe was the second child born in 1986 into a family of five in Ibadan, Oyo State South-Western Nigeria where she completed her primary and secondary school education. She attended St. Louis Grammar School, Ibadan before she proceeded to Lagos State University (LASU) where she graduated with a degree in Business Administration.

Career
Bisi's acting career shot into limelight after she starred in the movie Igboro Ti Daru. She went on to play leading roles in films including Bolode O'ku, Asiri Owo and Ebute. Bisi also produced movies including Latonwa, Eja Tutu and Oka. She was nominated in the "Revelation of The Year" category at the 2009 Best of Nollywood Awards and in the "Best Lead Actress in a Yoruba film" category at the 2012 edition.

Awards and nominations

Death
The death of Bisi Komolafe was reported in the media on 31 December 2012. The circumstances surrounding her death generated several reports and speculations in the media. However medical reports confirmed that she died of pregnancy related complications at the University College Hospital, Ibadan. She was buried on 4 January 2013 in Ibadan.

Selected filmography
 Igboro Ti Daru
 Aye Ore Meji
 Apere Ori
 Omo Olomo Larin Ero
 Jo Kin Jo
 Akun
 Bolode O'ku
 Aramotu
 Asiri Owo
 Ogbe Inu
 Aiyekooto
 Latonwa
 Alakada
 Mofe Jayo
 Ebute
 Iberu Bojo

Personal life
She was engaged to a Canadian-based Nigerian, Tunde Ijadunola in Oyo state.

See also
 List of Nigerian film producers
 List of Yoruba people
 List of Nigerian Actresses

References

External links
 

Yoruba actresses
Actresses in Yoruba cinema
21st-century Nigerian actresses
Actresses from Ibadan
1986 births
2012 deaths
Lagos State University alumni
Deaths in childbirth
Burials in Oyo State
Actresses from Oyo State
Nigerian film producers
Nigerian film directors
People from Oyo State
Actors in Yoruba cinema